A Kind of Loving may refer to:
 A Kind of Loving (novel)
 A Kind of Loving (film)